This is a list of notable Tennessee Volunteers starting quarterbacks and the years they participated on the Tennessee Volunteers football team.

Starting Quarterbacks

1972 to present

The following players were notable quarterbacks for the Tennessee Volunteers since UT joined the Southeastern Conference in 1933.

1933 to 1971 (incomplete)

1922 to 1932

The following quarterbacks were the predominant quarters for the Volunteers each season after the establishment of the Southern Conference until the establishment of the Southeastern Conference.

1896 to 1921 (incomplete)

The following quarterbacks were the predominant quarters for the Volunteers each season after the establishment of the Southern Intercollegiate Athletic Association until the establishment of the Southern Conference.

1891 to 1893
The following players were the predominant quarters for the Volunteers each season the team was a non-conference independent team, following the birth of Tennessee football.

Notes

References

Tennessee Volunteers

Tennessee Volunteers quarterbacks